Juan Carlos Arce Justiniano (born 10 April 1985) is a Bolivian professional footballer who plays as a forward or winger for the Bolivia national team.

Club career

Oriente Petrolero
Born in Santa Cruz de la Sierra, Arce started his career at Bolivia's famous youth academy Academia Tahuichi. In 2003 aged 18, Arce signed for Bolivian Primera División club Oriente Petrolero. In his debut season Arce played fifteen games scoring two goals and won the 2003 Copa Aerosur in the process. Following his debut season, Arce played forty four games in 2004 – cementing his position in the first team – scoring seven goals and helped the team to a Semi-finals finish in the Copa Aerosur.

Arce played fifteen games, scoring just three during the 2009 opening start to the season.

After less than one year after leaving the club, Arce returned and played two more season including both 2011 Bolivian Premera División and 2011–12 Bolivian Primera División. Arce scored six goals in his remaining seasons with the club playing only twenty three games. Arce played a total of 170 games for Albiverdes scoring 30 goals.

Brazil
In 2005, Arce played a total of thirty nine games scoring eight and helped the team win its second Copa Aerosur in three years. In 2006, after playing thirty four games for Oriente Petrolero – scoring four times – Arce was loaned out to Série B club Portuguesa, playing only in non-league fixtures.

The following season (2007) in January 2007, Arce was loaned out again to Série A club Corinthians. Arce played eighteen games for the Timão scoring just two goals. Despite having a good season with the Corinthians, Arce couldn't help the team avoid relegation, and with the arrival of a new manager he was removed from the squad. Arce also scored two more goals playing in the 2007 Copa do Brasil

Following the start of the 2009 Bolivian Primera División, Arce was loaned out to Brazil for a third time joining 2008 Copa do Brasil champions, and Série A club Sport Recife for a sixth-month period with the option to require his rights. Playing fifteen games and scoring four goals, Sport Recife finished last and were relegated to Série B.

Asia
After multiple loans out to Brazil, Arce was loaned out to the Qatar Stars League club Al-Arabi for the 2007–08 season. However, he found the language and the way of life there difficult,  despite managing to score 3 goals.

Arce, once again was loaned out, this came after playing one season in Qatar. He joined Seongnam FC for the remainder of the 2008 K League season, however, Arce played just ten games before leaving the club and returning to Bolivia. After a few months in his home country, he joined Sport Recife of Brazil in 2009, making 15 appearances and scoring 4 goals.

Akhmat Grozny
In 2010, Arce joined Russian Premier League side FC Akhmat Grozny signing a three-year deal. After only twenty games with the side and finishing just above relegation, Arce left the club and returned to Bolivia.

Bolívar
In January 2012, Arce signed for Bolivian Primera División giants Club Bolívar. Arce made his debut for the club in the 2012 Copa Libertadores. Coming on as substitute in the 63rd minute replacing Jhasmani Campos in there 1–1 draw against Chilean side Universidad Católica in Estadio San Carlos de Apoquindo, Santiago.

Arce scored his first goal for Bolívar in 2012 against La Paz scoring in the 89th minute after coming on as a substitute.

International career
Arce made his debut on 6 July 2004 in the 2004 Copa América against host nation Peru in a 2–2 draw at the National Stadium, Lima. Since his debut in 2004, Arce has been capped over 70 times for Bolivia, scoring a total of 12 goals.

Arce has competed at five Copa América tournaments (2004, 2007, 2011, 2016, 2021), and played through five World Cup qualifying campaigns (2006, 2010, 2014, 2018, 2022).

Career statistics
Scores and results list Bolivia's goal tally first.

References

External links
 
 
 Juan Carlos Arce Interview
 

1985 births
Living people
Sportspeople from Santa Cruz de la Sierra
Association football forwards
Bolivian footballers
Bolivian expatriate footballers
Bolivia international footballers
Oriente Petrolero players
Associação Portuguesa de Desportos players
Sport Club Corinthians Paulista players
Al-Arabi SC (Qatar) players
Seongnam FC players
Sport Club do Recife players
FC Akhmat Grozny players
Club Bolívar players
Bolivian expatriate sportspeople in Brazil
Expatriate footballers in Brazil
Expatriate footballers in South Korea
Expatriate footballers in Qatar
Expatriate footballers in Russia
2004 Copa América players
2007 Copa América players
2011 Copa América players
Copa América Centenario players
2021 Copa América players
K League 1 players
Russian Premier League players
Qatar Stars League players